Gérard Haché (March 17, 1925 – September 22, 2017) was a Canadian politician. He served in the Legislative Assembly of New Brunswick from 1967 to 1970 as a member of the Liberal party.

Haché co-found farm equipment dealer G.G. Haché & Frères Ltée in 1947, was a councilor in Bathurst, New Brunswick and served as school trustee.

Honours

 125th Anniversary of the Confederation of Canada Medal
 Order of New Brunswick

References

1925 births
2017 deaths
Members of the Legislative Assembly of New Brunswick
People from Gloucester County, New Brunswick